William Morris (12 February 1888 – 17 March 1949) was an English professional footballer who played as a wing half in the Football League for Aston Villa.

Personal life 
At an unspecified point between 1907 and 1910, Morris lived in the USA. He served on the Western Front with the Royal Army Service Corps during the First World War.

Career statistics

References 

1888 births
People from Clay Cross
Footballers from Derbyshire
English footballers
Aston Villa F.C. players
Royal Army Service Corps soldiers
Association football wing halves
English Football League players
Alfreton Town F.C. players
British Army personnel of World War I
Chesterfield F.C. players
Notts County F.C. wartime guest players
Shrewsbury Town F.C. players
Cradley Heath F.C. players
Clay Cross Town F.C. (1874) players
1949 deaths
English expatriate sportspeople in the United States